Edward John David Redmayne  (born 6 January 1982) is an English actor. Known primarily for his role in biopics, he has received various accolades, including an Academy Award, a Tony Award, a BAFTA Award, and two Olivier Awards.

He began his professional acting career in West End theatre before making his screen debut in 1996 with guest television appearances. His first films were Like Minds (2006), The Good Shepherd (2006) and Elizabeth: The Golden Age (2007). On the stage, Redmayne starred in the productions of Red from 2009 to 2010 and Richard II from 2011 to 2012. The former won him the Tony Award for Best Featured Actor in a Play and the Laurence Olivier Award for Best Actor in a Supporting Role. His film breakthrough came with the roles of Colin Clark in the biopic My Week with Marilyn (2011) and Marius Pontmercy in the musical Les Misérables (2012). 

Redmayne gained consecutive nominations for the Academy Award for Best Actor for his portrayals of the physicist Stephen Hawking in The Theory of Everything (2014) and the transgender artist Lili Elbe in The Danish Girl (2015), winning for the former. From 2016 to 2022, he starred as Newt Scamander in the Fantastic Beasts film series, and from 2021 to 2022, he starred in a production of Cabaret, winning the Laurence Olivier Award for Best Actor in a Musical. He has also portrayed Tom Hayden in The Trial of the Chicago 7 (2020) and Charles Cullen in The Good Nurse (2022).

Early life and education 
Edward John David Redmayne was born on 6 January 1982 in Westminster, London. His mother, Patricia (née Burke), runs a relocation business, and his father, Richard Redmayne, is a businessman in corporate finance. His paternal great-grandfather was Sir Richard Redmayne (1865–1955), a civil and mining engineer. He has an elder brother, cricketer James Redmayne, a younger brother, and an elder half-brother, Charlie Redmayne, who is CEO of the UK division of publisher HarperCollins and half-sister. From the age of 10, Redmayne attended Jackie Palmer Stage School, where he found his love for acting and singing, alongside James Corden.

Redmayne attended Eaton House, Colet Court, and then Eton College, where he was in the same year as Prince William. He went on to read History of Art at Trinity College, Cambridge, from where he graduated with 2:1 Honours in 2003. He received a choral scholarship to attend Cambridge. While at Cambridge, Redmayne was a member of the University Pitt Club.

Career

Redmayne modelled for Burberry in 2008 with Alex Pettyfer, and in 2012 with Cara Delevingne. In the September 2012 issue of Vanity Fair, he was featured on its annual International Best Dressed List. In 2015, he was named number one in GQs 50 best dressed British men.

Stage
Redmayne made his professional stage debut as Viola in Twelfth Night, for Shakespeare's Globe at the Middle Temple Hall in 2002. He won the award for Outstanding Newcomer at the 50th Evening Standard Theatre Awards in 2004, for his performance in Edward Albee's The Goat, or Who Is Sylvia?, and the award for Best Newcomer at the Critics' Circle Theatre Awards in 2005. Later stage credits include Now or Later by Christopher Shinn at the Royal Court Theatre. The show ran from 3 September to 1 November 2008.

In 2009, Redmayne appeared in John Logan's new play Red at the Donmar Warehouse in London, for which he won the 2010 Olivier Award for Best Actor in a Supporting Role. He reprised his role in Red at the John Golden Theatre on Broadway, in a 15-week run from 11 March to 27 June 2010, and won the 2010 Tony Award for Best Performance by a Featured Actor in a Play. He portrayed King Richard II in Richard II directed by Michael Grandage, at the Donmar Warehouse from 6 December 2011 to 4 February 2012.

In November 2021, he returned to the stage as Emcee in a West End revival of Cabaret at the Playhouse Theatre, remodelled as the 'Kit Kat Club'. He previously played the role in a production at Eton when he was 17 years-old, which was later taken to the Edinburgh Fringe. Redmayne chose Jessie Buckley to star alongside him as Sally Bowles, and successfully approached Rebecca Frecknall about directing the production. At the 2022 Olivier Awards, the revival led with 7 wins including Redmayne's own for Best Actor in a Musical.

Film and television
Redmayne made his screen debut in 1998 in an episode of Animal Ark. His television credits include the BBC miniseries Tess of the d'Urbervilles, the miniseries The Pillars of the Earth, and the two-part miniseries Birdsong.

Redmayne was cast in his first feature film Like Minds (2006) after being spotted by casting director Lucy Bevan performing in a play called Goats. Redmayne has appeared in films such as The Good Shepherd (2006), Savage Grace (2007), Powder Blue (2008), The Other Boleyn Girl (2008), Glorious 39 (2009), and Hick (2011). He starred as Osmund in Christopher Smith's supernatural gothic chiller film Black Death (2010). His 2008 Sundance drama film The Yellow Handkerchief was released on 26 February 2010 by Samuel Goldwyn Films.

In 2011, Redmayne starred as filmmaker Colin Clark in the drama film My Week with Marilyn. He took on the role of Marius Pontmercy for the 2012 musical film Les Misérables.

In 2014, Redmayne starred as Stephen Hawking in The Theory of Everything, a role for which he won the Academy Award, BAFTA, Golden Globe, and Screen Actors Guild Award for Best Actor, depicting the debilitating challenges of ALS.

In early 2015, Redmayne appeared in the Wachowski sisters' film, Jupiter Ascending as Balem Abrasax. The film was widely panned, including his performance, and won him the Golden Raspberry Award for Worst Supporting Actor.
Redmayne also presented the 2015 documentary War Art with Eddie Redmayne, made as part of the ITV's Perspectives programme.
Redmayne guest starred as Ryan the tank engine in Thomas & Friends movie special Sodor's Legend of the Lost Treasure.

That same year, Redmayne starred in the biographical drama The Danish Girl, directed by Academy Award-winning director Tom Hooper. In the film, released in the United Kingdom on 1 January 2016, Redmayne portrayed transgender pioneer Lili Elbe, a casting choice that was met with backlash from the transgender community. Nonetheless, Redmayne's performance garnered critical acclaim; in January 2016, he earned his second nomination for the Academy Award for Best Actor in consecutive years. Redmayne later acknowledged the controversy surrounding his casting by stressing the importance of casting transgender people to play transgender characters.

In 2016, Redmayne starred as Newt Scamander in the film adaptation of Fantastic Beasts and Where to Find Them, the first of a series within the Wizarding World of the Harry Potter film series, with a screenplay by J. K. Rowling. Fantastic Beasts was a critical and commercial success. In 2018, Redmayne starred in the stop-motion animated film Early Man, and reprised his role as Newt Scamander in Fantastic Beasts: The Crimes of Grindelwald as well as its third sequel, Fantastic Beasts: The Secrets of Dumbledore, which was released in April 2022  . Both  The Crimes of Grindelwald and The Secrets of Dumbledore received mixed critical reception but emerged as  financial successes. All  of J. K. Rowling's Fantastic Beasts films rank among Redmayne's highest-grossing films to date. In 2020, Redmayne starred as Tom Hayden in The Trial of the Chicago 7.

Personal life
Redmayne married Hannah Bagshawe on 15 December 2014. They have a daughter, Iris, born in 2016 and a son, Luke, born in 2018.

Redmayne was appointed Officer of the Order of the British Empire (OBE) in the 2015 Birthday Honours for services to drama. In August 2014, he was appointed ambassador of film education charity Into Film. He has been a patron of the Motor Neurone Disease Association since 2015, having become associated with the charity following his portrayal of Stephen Hawking. He is an ambassador of the Teenage Cancer Trust. He is a patron of Mousetrap Theatre Projects, a charity dedicated to enriching the lives of children and young people through theatre, especially those who are disadvantaged or have additional needs.

Acting credits

Film

Television

Theatre

Video games

Accolades

See also

 List of British actors
List of British Academy Award nominees and winners
List of actors with Academy Award nominations
List of actors with two or more Academy Award nominations in acting categories
 List of Old Etonians born in the 20th century
 List of University of Cambridge members

References

External links

 
 
 
 
 

1982 births
Living people
20th-century English male actors
21st-century English male actors
Alumni of Trinity College, Cambridge
Audiobook narrators
Best Actor Academy Award winners
Best Actor BAFTA Award winners
Best Drama Actor Golden Globe (film) winners
Critics' Circle Theatre Award winners
English male film actors
English male Shakespearean actors
English male stage actors
English male television actors
English male video game actors
English male voice actors
English people of Irish descent
English people of Welsh descent
Laurence Olivier Award winners
Male actors from London
Models from London
Officers of the Order of the British Empire
Outstanding Performance by a Cast in a Motion Picture Screen Actors Guild Award winners
Outstanding Performance by a Male Actor in a Leading Role Screen Actors Guild Award winners
People educated at Colet Court
People educated at Eton College
People from Westminster
Eddie
Singers from London
Theatre World Award winners
Tony Award winners